George Lewis & Turk Murphy at Newport is a live album by George Lewis' Sextet and Turk Murphy's Septet recorded at the Newport Jazz Festival in 1957 and released on the Verve label.

Track listing
 "Basin Street Blues" (Spencer Williams) – 1:28
 "Bourbon Street Parade" (Paul Barbarin) – 5:15
 "Tin Roof Blues" (George Brunies, Paul Mares, Ben Pollack, Leon Roppolo, Mel Stitzel) – 6:37
 "Royal Garden Blues" (Clarence Williams, Spencer Williams) – 4:06
 "That's a Plenty" (Lew Pollack, Ray Gilbert) – 4:55
 "St. James Infirmary" (Joe Primrose) – 4:23
 "Weary Blues" (Artie Matthews) – 3:29
 "Down by the Riverside" (Traditional) – 3:55
Recorded at the Newport Jazz Festival, Newport, RI on July 4, 1957 (tracks 1–5) and July 6, 1957 (tracks 6–8)

Personnel

Tracks 1–5
George Lewis – clarinet 
Jack Willis – trumpet
Bob Thomas – trombone
Joe Robichaux – piano 
Alcide "Slow Drag" Pavageau – bass
Joe Watkins – drums

Tracks 6–8
Turk Murphy – trombone, vocals
Larry Conger – trumpet
Bill Napier – clarinet
Peter Clute – piano
Dick Lammi – banjo
Al Conger – tuba
Thad Vandon – drums

References

Verve Records live albums
George Lewis (clarinetist) live albums
Turk Murphy live albums
Albums recorded at the Newport Jazz Festival
1957 live albums
Albums produced by Norman Granz